Michael Bentwood (born 10 January 1978 and based in Altrincham) is a British auto racing driver. After starting racing in Karting, he entered the 1994 Formula First Winter Series, finishing the season in tenth. In 1995 he finished fifth in the Formula Vauxhall Junior Winter Series. He then spent four years between 1997-2000 in the British Formula 3 Class A Championship where he finished the highest placed British driver in the year 2000; winning the Raymond Mays Trophy and the BRDC Spencer Charrington Trophy. He was also awarded BRDC membership. He was proposed by Johnny Herbert and second by John Cardwell. The years of ultra competitive Formula 3 were followed in 2001 with a drive in the Euro Formula 3000 Series where he finished the season in twelfth place with a handful of top six finishes.

Career

He first drove in the BTCC in 2003, racing in a BMW 320i for Edenbridge Racing. He finished the season third in class with a number of wins, in what was the championships final year of the production class. With only one class in 2004, he continued racing in the BTCC in a four-year-old Vauxhall Astra Coupe for VX Racing Junior, a 'semi' works drive with Techspeed. (Yvan Muller's old car) In the Independents Championship he placed seventh, and thirteenth in the overall standings with a couple of wins in the Independents and a number of podiums in the main championship where he had some tremendous battles with Yvan Muller, James Thompson and Anthony Reid. The latter would ironically be his teammate one year later.

In 2005 he raced in the British GT Championship in a Nissan 350Z for RJN Motorsport as a works driver. He had many teammates that year including Alister McRae and Anthony Reid. The Nissan showed quite well particularly at the last round at Silverstone where Michael competed for the lead against Ben Collins in the Porsche and Tim Mullen in the Ferrari. That year he also drove in the Britcar 24 Hour race at Silverstone Circuit in a Lotus Elise Sport but the car proved very unreliable. Due to a knee operation he only dove in selected rounds in 2006, in a Barwell Motorsport ran Aston Martin DBRS9, as well as some rounds in the FIA GT3 Championship. He showed well in the V12 Aston and in 2007 he went on to take his first victory in GT3 with Barwell Motorsport and co - driver Tom Alexender. He stayed with an Aston Martin DBRS9 in 2008 for the 22GT Racing Team with a hard fought pole position against Allan Simonsen at Thruxton and a number of podium finishes, again sharing the car with Tom Alexander, Adrian Wilmot and Andy Jenkinson. In the same year, he also worked with Prodrive developing the latest Traction Control software for their GT3 customer cars with Richard Groundsell and drove at Classic Le Mans with Tom Alexander in a very rare 1959 DB4 GT. 

In 2009 he drove for RPM Motorsport in a Ford GT in selected races sharing with Philip Walker. For 2010 he returned to the Aston Martin DBRS9 with Barwell Motorsport sharing the car with Paul Whight. They were competitive with a couple of third places but did not complete the whole championship. He also drove at the Merdeka millennium 12-hour race at the Sepang F1 circuit again in an Aston Martin DBRS9 with drivers Frank Yu and Alain Li. They managed to beat the works Petronas BMW team finishing in fifth place. Michael was the highest placed British driver in the highest placed British car.

Results record

Complete British Touring Car Championship results
(key) Races in bold indicate pole position (1 point awarded just for first race, 2003 in class) Races in italics indicate fastest lap (1 point awarded all races, 2003 in class) * signifies that driver lead race for at least one lap (1 point awarded all races)

References

External links
 

1978 births
British Touring Car Championship drivers
Living people
British GT Championship drivers
British Formula Three Championship drivers
Auto GP drivers
Carlin racing drivers
Euronova Racing drivers
Fortec Motorsport drivers